Merrow Downs, in Surrey, England is an area of common land at the edge of the former village of Merrow, now a suburb of Guildford. It forms part of Surrey Hills AONB right on the edge of the ridge of hills that forms the North Downs.

It is owned by Guildford Borough Council, who lease part of the common to Guildford golf club, with the public retaining the right to roam. Most of the common covered by the golf course is chalk downland while other areas are covered by broad leaved woodland. This is predominantly hazel coppice under oak in the older parts of the common, a woodland rich in biodiversity complemented by stands of old yew trees. In the last 100 years the common ceased to be used for grazing and the cutting of hazel, and other tree species such as blackthorn, holly and ash now dominate the landscape, covering areas that were once open grassland.

Sport
Merrow Down was the site of Guildford Bason, a ground used for cricket in the 18th century. Guildford Golf Club has used the site of the former race course since 1888.

Prisoner of War camp
In 1942 a POW camp was erected on Merrow Down as Work Camp 57. Initially holding Italian prisoners captured in North Africa, by 1945 it also held German POWs. All Italians had left by September 1946 but 540 prisoners remained in March 1948. The huts were used after the war as temporary housing for local people before demolition in the late 1950s.

References
 

Common land in England